Palaiosouda ("old Souda"), also known as Marathi, is an islet located south of the town of Marathi, close to Souda Bay in Crete. The islet is a popular diving location.

See also
List of islands of Greece

References

Landforms of Chania (regional unit)
Uninhabited islands of Crete
Islands of Greece